Elvie Villasanta (December 14, 1928 – February 8, 2013) was a Filipina comedian. She starred in Mommy Elvie's Problematic Show and Mommy Elvie @ 18. She was the mother of Ariel Villasanta.

References

1928 births
2013 deaths
Filipino women comedians
Filipino television actresses
People from Quezon City
Actresses from Metro Manila
Deaths from cancer in the Philippines
Deaths from breast cancer